North Hobart Cricket Club  also known as the "Demons" represent North Hobart in Tasmania's Grade Cricket Competition.

North Hobart Cricket Club was founded in 1905, and won the "A Grade" competition in their first season, quickly establishing themselves as a powerful club in the TCA competition winning more 1st grade premierships than any other TCA club. Their home ground is the TCA ground which is located on the Queens Domain.

NHCC have won 20 TCA Premierships, The most recent premierships was in the 2009/2010 season where the team won the 50 over 20/20 and the two-day premiership beating a strong University team that contained Tim Paine, James Faulkner, Jason Krejza, Rhett Lockyear and Graeme Cunningham beating them comfortable every time, in that year North Hobart created history to become the first team to win all three competitions in a season.

Honours
TCA Premierships: (20) 1905–06,1906–07,1908–09,1911–12,1912–13,1947–48,1949–50,1954–55,1970–71,1972–73,1978–79,1991–92,
1992–93,1993–94,1995–96,1998–99,2001–2002,2004–2005, 2005–2006,2009–2010

TCA/CTPL Limited Overs Cup (1)1985-86
Kookaburra Cup (6)1989-90, 1992–93, 1996–97, 1997–98, 2001–02, 2009–10

TCA/CTPL Twenty 20 Cup (1) 2009-10
Statewide Twenty 20 Cup (1)2009
Statewide Twenty 20 Cup (1) 2018/19

Women's Grade Cricket Competition 2010-11

State players
North Hobart boast 70 state players through their proud history some of the recent players are Sean Clingeleffer, Michael Dighton, Michael DiVenuto, Adam Griffth, Nick Kruger, Dan Marsh, Todd Pinnington, John Rogers, Shaun Young, Jordan Silk, Caleb Jewell, Tom Rogers, Jake Doran and Alex Pyecroft

Life Members
‌

D.C. Green †
V.L.Hooper †
R.J.Drew†

B.Brownlow †
E. Deakes †
C. Richardson  †
R. Richardson  †
B. Richardson (Betty) †
G. Long
L. Appleton
B. Cotton  †
G. Taylor
I. Cotton   †
E. Richardson  †
P. O’May
T. Rooney
D. Males
C. Bowerman
T. Pinnington
L. Cox
M. Harry
P. Collins
R. De Groot
G. Maynard
D. Manson
A. Judd
K. Taylor
D. Mizzen
D. Bearman
D. Marsh       (2010/11) 	 
M. DiVenuto    (2010/11)
A. Griffith    (2011/12)
D. Collins     (2011/12)
S. Jewell      (2011/12)
M. Bowerman    (2011/12)

Club Partnership Records

External links
 NHCC Website

Tasmanian grade cricket clubs
1905 establishments in Australia
Cricket clubs established in 1905
North Hobart, Tasmania
Sport in Hobart